Princess Rooney (March 22, 1980 – October 7, 2008) was an American Champion Thoroughbred racehorse who was the first winner of a Breeders' Cup race to be inducted into the  U.S. Racing Hall of Fame.

Racing career
Racing at age two, Princess Rooney won all six of her starts that marked the beginnings of a three-year racing career in which she would  finish out of the money only once. In 1983, at age three, she won five of her six races, including the Kentucky Oaks and finished second one time. At age four, Princess Rooney won five races then secured her first Eclipse Award as the United States' Champion Older Mare with a victory in the 1984 Breeders' Cup Distaff. Princess Rooney was owned throughout her racing career by Paula Tucker.

Stud record
Retired after her Breeder's Cup win, in 1985 Princess Rooney was in foal to leading sire Danzig when Texan George Aubin purchased her at the Keeneland Sales November auction for $5.5 million, at the time the third-highest amount ever paid for a broodmare. Princess Rooney turned out to be less than a success in breeding and ten years later was sold for $130,000 to the Gentry Brothers Farm near Lexington, Kentucky, in 1995.  In 2004 she produced her last foal, House of Words. House of Words is a 2008 winner.

Princess Rooney was euthanized at Gentry Brothers Farm near Lexington October 7, 2008, due to complications of equine protozoal myeloencephalitis (EPM). She had been diagnosed with EPM at Rood & Riddle Equine Hospital August 1, 2008.

Two of Princess Rooney's daughters, Rooneys Princess and Rose Tiara, are broodmares at Gentry Brothers. Rooneys Princess' yearling is a Tale of the Cat colt, Rosa Tiara's yearling is a Lion Heart filly.

Honors
In 1991, Princess Rooney was inducted into the United States' National Museum of Racing and Hall of Fame.

References

1980 racehorse births
2008 racehorse deaths
Racehorses bred in Kentucky
Racehorses trained in the United States
Breeders' Cup Distaff winners
Eclipse Award winners
United States Thoroughbred Racing Hall of Fame inductees
Kentucky Oaks winners
Thoroughbred family 1-x